The Downtown Emergency Service Center (DESC) is a non-profit organization in Seattle, Washington providing services for that city's homeless population.  The organization was founded in 1979 to aid men and women living in a state of chronic homelessness who, due to their severe and persistent mental and addictive illnesses, were not being served by the existing shelters of the time. At its opening, the non-profit sheltered nearly 200 adults from 7 p.m. to 7 a.m. in the ballroom of the Morrison Hotel. Today, DESC is a recognized national leader in homelessness services that specializes in shelters and supportive housing projects. It operates under a Housing First model with a low-barrier for entry into services. DESC clients engage with mental health services, case management and employment services at DESC projects. DESC currently operates 5 shelters and 15 supportive housing projects and is largely funded by the City of Seattle and King County.

Mission 
DESC helps people with the complex needs of homelessness, substance use disorders, and serious mental illness achieve their highest potential for health and well-being through comprehensive services, treatment, and housing

History
In the late 1970s, Seattle's Downtown Human Service Council Group expressed concern to Seattle's mayor that there were increases in homelessness and that the mentally ill were not getting the services they needed. Because of these concerns, the City of Seattle, the Church Council of Seattle and WAMI (Washington Advocates for the Mentally Ill) partnered to open the center in 1979.

DESC was given the 2012 non profit sector achievement award by the National Alliance to End Homelessness.

Innovation

1811 Eastlake project
DESC designed and developed the 1811 Eastlake project to house up to 75 formerly homeless alcoholics. Residents in this housing project are permitted to possess and consume alcohol in their rooms and are not required to enroll in treatment as a condition of their housing. These terms were initially controversial as critics voiced anger that residents did not have to stay sober.

A study by the University of Washington showed a 35 percent reduction in heavy drinking among 1811 residents and a substantially reduced frequency of delirium tremens. A 2006 study by the University of Washington found that 1811 Eastlake improved residents' lives and saved Seattle more than $2 million each year.

Housing First
DESC partnered with Pathways to Housing to sponsor the first ever conference on the Housing First model of social services.

See also
Housing First
Homelessness in the United States

References

External links
Official website
DESC Profile from Action Without Borders
Grantee information from the US Department of Housing and Urban Development

Homelessness charities
Non-profit organizations based in Seattle
Organizations established in 1979